The men's basketball tournament at the 2019 Southeast Asian Games was held at the Mall of Asia Arena in Pasay, Metro Manila, Philippines from 4 to 10 December.

Competition schedule
The following is the competition schedule for the men's basketball competitions:

Participating nations

Competition format
The preliminary round was composed of two groups of four teams each. Each team played the teams within their group. The top two teams per group advanced to the knockout round. The other teams qualified to the classification round.
Classification round:
5th place: Third place teams played for fifth place.
7th place: Fourth place teams played for seventh place.
The knockout round was a single-elimination tournament, with a bronze medal match for the semi-finals losers. The losing team in the final was awarded the silver medal, while the winning team was awarded the gold medal.

Venue
The regular 5-on-5 basketball tournament was held at the Mall of Asia Arena in Pasay.

Cuneta Astrodome was also previously considered as a potential venue for 5-on-5 basketball while the SM Mall of Asia Activity Center was considered to host the 3x3 basketball competitions.

Results
All times are Philippine Standard Time (UTC+8)

Preliminary round

Group A

Group B

Classification round

7th place match

5th place match

Knockout round

Semi-finals

Bronze medal match

Gold medal match

Final standings

See also
Women's tournament

References

External links
  

Men